Ayn Ruymen (born July 18, 1947) is an American former actress and theater director. She began her career as a stage actress, starring in a Broadway production of Neil Simon's The Gingerbread Lady (1970–1971), for which she won a Theatre World Award.

After relocating to Los Angeles, Ruymen made her feature film debut in Paul Bartel's horror film Private Parts (1972) and appeared in several television films during the 1970s. She had a lead role on the sitcom The McLean Stevenson Show from 1976 to 1977. She made her last screen appearance in the television film Firestorm: 72 Hours in Oakland (1993). Since then, Ruymen has worked primarily as a theater director of productions for the Mendocino Theatre Company.

Early life
Ruymen was born July 18, 1947 in Brooklyn, New York City, one of six children, and was raised in Long Island. Her father, George Ruymen, worked as a building inspector for the City of New York. She began working as an actress while still a teenager, performing in theater productions in New Jersey. In 1969, Ruymen appeared as a model at the Miami International Boat Show to promote Sungard sunscreen, covering half her face in it before spending time in the sun, demonstrating the product's efficacy at preventing sunburns.

Career

In 1970, she was cast as Polly Meara in a Broadway production of Neil Simon's The Gingerbread Lady opposite Maureen Stapleton, which ran between December 1970 and 1971. Critic George Oppenheimer praised Ruymen for "showing great promise" in the "difficult" role. For her performance, she won the Theatre World Award in 1971. During her stage career, she became a member of Actors' Equity.

Ruymen subsequently relocated to Los Angeles in late 1971 to pursue a film career. She commented that she initially disliked California: "I found the Sunset Strip disgusting. I was trying to get work and nothing happened for six months. It makes you want to pull your hair out." In early 1972, she was cast in an episode of the medical drama series Medical Center. She was subsequently cast in the lead role of Paul Bartel's horror film Private Parts (1972), playing a young woman who uncovers dark secrets in a Los Angeles hotel operated by her aunt. The following year, she appeared in the television film Go Ask Alice. She later had a minor uncredited role as a nurse in Steven Spielberg's Jaws (1975).

Between 1976 and 1977, Ruymen had a lead role on the sitcom The McLean Stevenson Show, playing the daughter of a hardware store proprietor.

Ruymen's last film appearance was the 1993 television film Firestorm: 72 Hours in Oakland. In September 2009, she married Robert Ross, a visual artist and instructor at the Mendocino Arts Center and Oregon School of Arts & Crafts.

Ruymen has directed numerous plays for the Mendocino Theatre Company (MTC) as early as 1993, when she directed a production of Love Letters, which featured a nightly rotating cast. In August 2009, she directed an MTC stage production of W. Somerset Maugham's The Circle.

Select filmography

Film

Television

Stage credits

References

External links

 
 

1947 births
Actresses from New York City
American film actresses
American stage actresses
American television actresses
American theatre directors
Female models from New York (state)
People from Long Island
Theatre World Award winners
Living people